LOZ or Loz may refer to:
 The Legend of Zelda series of video games
The Legend of Zelda (video game), the first game in the series
The Legend of Zelda (TV series), an animated TV series loosely based on the video games
 Loz, a character from the film Final Fantasy VII: Advent Children
 London-Corbin Airport in London, Kentucky (IATA airport code)
 The ISO 639-2 and ISO 639-3 language code for the Lozi language
 Laurence Shahlaei, English strongman